Scorpaenopsis brevifrons, the bigmouth scorpionfish, is a species of venomous marine ray-finned fish belonging to the family Scorpaenidae, the scorpionfishes. This species is found in the Eastern Central Pacific Ocean.

Size

References

brevifrons
Taxa named by William N. Eschmeyer
Taxa named by John Ernest Randall
Fish described in 1975